Open Your Eyes is a Polish supernatural thriller television series created by Netflix, based on the 2013 novel Druga szansa by Katarzyna Berenika Miszczuk.

Synopsis
Julia wakes up in an amnesia treatment centre after losing her family in a terrible accident. She begins to build relationships with other patients at the centre who have suffered similar traumas. One of these is Adam, who shows her around. Julia begins to have strange dreams and visions and gradually starts to question the place she finds herself confined in. She tries to escape from the institution in order to discover the truth.

Cast and characters
 Maria Wawreniuk as Julia
 Magdalena Budzowska as young Julia
 Ignacy Liss as Adam
 Michal Sikorski as Pawel
 Wojciech Dolatowski as Szymon
 Klaudia Koscista as Iza
 Zuzanna Galewicz as Milena
 Marta Nieradkiewicz as Dr. Zofia Morulska
 Sara Celler-Jezierska as Magda
 Marcin Czarnik as Piotr
 Martyna Nowakowska as Anielka
 Lukasz Nowicki as voice of black cube

References

External links
 
 

2021 Polish television series debuts
Polish-language Netflix original programming
Television shows set in Poland
Polish fantasy television series
2020s mystery television series
2020s Polish television series
Polish drama television series